Julia Görges and Vladimíra Uhlířová were the defending champions, but Görges chose to participate in Bad Gastein.
Uhlířová partnered up with Maria Kondratieva and won in the final against Anna Chakvetadze and Marina Erakovic 6–4, 2–6, [10–7].

Seeds

Draw

Draw

External links
Doubles Draw

Doubles
Banka Koper Slovenia Open